Ian Johnson (born 1 September 1975) is an English former professional footballer who played as a winger.

Career
Born in Sunderland, Johnson made four appearances in the Football League for Middlesbrough and Bradford City. He later played non-league football for Blyth Spartans, Durham City and Ashington.

References

1975 births
Living people
English footballers
Middlesbrough F.C. players
Bradford City A.F.C. players
Blyth Spartans A.F.C. players
Durham City A.F.C. players
Ashington A.F.C. players
English Football League players
Association football wingers